Liam Mac Con Iomaire (born 1937, Casla, County Galway – died 2019) was a highly respected Irish writer, journalist and broadcaster.

He was a newsreader on RTÉ. He was author of a number of books and some translations, mainly concerning Connemara, as well as landmark Irish language biographies of Breandán Ó hEithir and Seosamh Ó hÉanaí. He was the father of musician, Colm Mac Con Iomaire.

Liam Mac Con Iomaire and Tim Robinson won the 2016 Lois Roth Award for a Translation of a Literary Work for Graveyard Clay / Cré na Cille: A Narrative in Ten Interludes, by Máirtín Ó Cadhain (Yale Univ. Press, 2016).

Bibliography
 Ireland of the Proverb (with Bill Doyle), Rinehart Publishers, 1995.
 Conamara:The Unknown Country (with Bob Quinn), Chló Iar-Chonnacht, 1997.
 Breandán Ó hEithir: Iomramh Aonair, Chló Iar-Chonnacht, 2000.
 Controller's Report Yearbook 2002, Wiley & Sons Canada, Limited, 2003.
 Seosamh Ó hÉanaí: Nár fhagha mé bás choíche, Chló Iar-Chonnacht, 2007.
 Graveyard Clay (with Tim Robinson), Yale University Press, 2015. (Translated from the original Máirtín Ó Cadhain novel Cré na Cille).

See also
 Mac Con Iomaire, the Gaelic-Irish surname

References

External links
Obituary, irishtimes.com; accessed 22 July 2020.
Obituary, rte.ie; accessed 22 July 2020.
Notice of death of Liam Mac Con Iomaire; accessed 22 July 2020.
Liam Mac Con Iomaire profile, beo.ie; accessed 22 July 2020.

Irish biographers
Irish male writers
Male biographers
RTÉ newsreaders and journalists
People from County Galway
2019 deaths
1937 births
20th-century Irish people
21st-century Irish people
Irish-language writers